Focus Multimedia Ltd is a multi-faceted publisher and retailer of video games, consumer software and mobile apps. Founded in 1995, the company is headquartered in the town of Rugeley in Staffordshire, England, and has about 30 employees.

The company's original concept was to sell bundles of CD-ROM titles. That's Multimedia Volume 1 was launched in 1995, marketed as "15 titles for all the family". It included CD-ROM games such as International Sensible Soccer, Lombard RAC Rally, Jack Nicklaus Golf and F-15 Strike Eagle II, alongside encyclopedias, music and software.

In the following years Focus established itself as a market leader in impulse price PC games and software in the United Kingdom, taking PC CD-ROM titles into many high street and non-traditional retailers for the first time.

Past publishing partners included Ubisoft, THQ, Rovio Entertainment, Lego Software, Encyclopædia Britannica, Big Fish Games and PopCap Games.

Focus has two flagship brands, Fanatical.com and Driving Test Success.

In 1997, Focus first published Driving Test Success CD-ROM revision software, designed for learner drivers and motorcyclists in Great Britain and Northern Ireland. In 2010 Focus launched its first mobile apps for iPhone, Theory Test and Hazard Perception. Driving Test Success apps are now available for iPhone, iPad, Android, Amazon Kindle, and the company also provides digital downloads and online training subscriptions. Focus has also launched revision software for trainee driving instructors, LGV and PCV drivers. Since launch, the brand has helped over 11 million learner drivers pass their theory test.

In 2021, Focus Multimedia was acquired by the entertainment company focusing on content about gaming, comic books, movies and TV shows, Fandom, owned by private equity firm TPG. The deal is yet another instance of Fandom attempting to increase its market through both selling products directly to its customers while better luring marketers. Financial terms were not disclosed.

References

External links 
 

Software companies of the United Kingdom
Software companies established in 1995
British companies established in 1995
1995 establishments in England